ZoomInfo Technologies Inc. is a software and data company which provides information and data for companies and business individuals.

History
In 2007, DiscoverOrg was founded by Henry Schuck and Kirk Brown. In February 2019, it acquired its competitor Zoom Information, Inc. and subsequently rebranded as ZoomInfo. DiscoverOrg's CEO Henry Schuck, CFO Cameron Hyzer, and Chief Revenue Officer Chris Hays took on the same roles at the combined entity. Zoom Information was originally established in 2000 as Eliyon Technologies by founders Yonatan Stern and Michel Decary, and in August 2017 was acquired by Great Hill Partners, a private equity firm, for $240 million in cash.

In June 4, 2020, ZoomInfo became a publicly traded company on the Nasdaq Global Select Market under the ticker symbol “ZI.”

In 2022, ZoomInfo expanded to a four-piece operating system when new offering, MarketingOS, was added to their platform. MarketingOS is an account-based marketing platform.

Acquisitions 
In 2017, as DiscoverOrg, the company acquired RainKing and in 2018, NeverBounce and Datanyze. In 2019, ZoomInfo acquired Komiko and in 2020, Clickagy and EverString Technology. In 2021, ZoomInfo acquired Insent, Chorus.ai, and RingLead.

References

External links

O'Brien, Kelly J. (August 17, 2017). How ZoomInfo's CEO sold three companies for $431M over 24 years. Boston Business Journal.

Software companies established in 2007
Internet properties established in 2007
Companies based in Vancouver, Washington
Domain-specific search engines
Software companies of the United States
Software companies of Israel
Companies listed on the Nasdaq
2017 mergers and acquisitions
2019 mergers and acquisitions
2020 initial public offerings
Startup databases
American companies established in 2007